Lieutenant General Gustaf Adolf Westring (2 September 1900 – 15 March 1963) was a Swedish Air Force officer. Westring served as commanding officer of Västmanland Wing, as head of the Royal Swedish Air Force Staff College, as Chief of the Air Staff and as head of the Swedish National Defence College. He was also head of the Swedish contingent to the Neutral Nations Supervisory Commission (NNSC).

Early life
Westring was born on 2 September 1900 in Stockholm, the son of president of the Svea Court of Appeal, Hjalmar Westring and his wife, Countess Adélaïde Stackelberg. His brothers were Claes Westring (born 1893), a diplomat, and Lennart Westring (born 1897), a physician.

Career

He graduated as a naval officer in 1922 and was commissioned as a fänrik in the Swedish Navy. He underwent flight training in 1924. Westring attended the staff course at the Royal Swedish Naval Staff College from 1928 to 1929. Westring became a lieutenant in the Swedish Air Force in 1929 and served in the Air Staff from 1929 to 1934 and was an expert in the 1930 Defence Commission from 1931 to 1935. In 1936, Westring underwent pilot training for heavy bomber in Royal Air Force. Back in Sweden, he then served in the Air Staff from 1936 to 1940.

He was promoted to major in 1939 and was head of the Operations Department in the Air Staff in 1940. From 1940 to 1942, Westring served as head of the Air Operations Department in the Defence Staff. He was promoted to colonel in 1943 and served as commanding officer of the Västmanland Wing from 1942 to 1945 and then as head of the Royal Swedish Air Force Staff College from 1945 to 1947. Westring was then Chief of the Air Staff for ten years, from 1947 to 1957, and he was promoted to major general in 1950. He was head of the Swedish National Defence College from 1957 to 1960  and of the Swedish Delegation to the Neutral Nations Supervisory Commission (NNSC) in Korea from 1 October 1960 to 31 October 1961. Westring was promoted to lieutenant general in 1961 and retired from the military.

Westring served as a military adviser at the disarmament conference in Geneva in 1962 and he belonged to AB Atlas Copco's Executive Board from 1962 to 1963.

Personal life
In 1927, he married Anna Löfving (1903–1989), the daughter of stationmaster Oscar Löfving and Anna Holmlin. They had four children: Margareta (born 1929), Gösta (born 1931), Elisabeth (born 1938) and Peter (born 1942).

Death
Westring died on 15 March 1963 when Lloyd Aéreo Boliviano Flight 915 from Arica, Chile to La Paz, Bolivia, that was operated by a Douglas DC-6 (registered CP-707) on this day, crashed into Chachacomani mountain, killing all 36 passengers and three crew members. Westring was working for AB Atlas Copco at the time. Another Swede died on the same flight, Lars Gunnar Nilsson, a sales engineer at Atlas Copco's South American subsidiary.

He was buried on 4 May 1963 in Djursholm Cemetery.

Dates of rank
1922 – Acting sub-lieutenant (Swedish Navy)
1924 – Lieutenant
1929 – Lieutenant (Swedish Air Force)
1938 – Captain
1939 – Major
1942 – Lieutenant colonel
1943 – Colonel
1950 – Major general
1961 – Lieutenant general

Awards and decorations

Swedish
  Commander 1st Class of the Order of the Sword (6 June 1951)
  Commander 1st Class of the Order of Vasa
  Knight of the Order of the Polar Star

Foreign
  Commander 1st Class of the Order of the White Rose of Finland
  Commander with Star of the Order of St. Olav (1 July 1960)
  Commander of the Order of the Dannebrog
  Officer of the Legion of Honour
  Officer of the Legion of Merit (20 September 1960)

Honours
Member of the Royal Swedish Academy of War Sciences (1943)

Bibliography

References

1900 births
1963 deaths
Swedish Air Force lieutenant generals
Military personnel from Stockholm
Members of the Royal Swedish Academy of War Sciences
Commanders First Class of the Order of the Sword
Commanders First Class of the Order of Vasa
Knights of the Order of the Polar Star
Foreign recipients of the Legion of Merit
Victims of aviation accidents or incidents in Bolivia
Victims of aviation accidents or incidents in 1963